Fijai Senior High School, formerly Fijai Secondary School, is a co-educational senior high school located in the Western Region of Ghana. The name Fijai is from the native dialect "Afei Gyae Me", which literally means "Now, leave me alone".

History 
The school got under way in 1952 as Sekondi Day Secondary School, as part of the 1951 Accelerated Plan for Education of the then Gold Coast Government.

The school was commissioned by the Paramount Chief of Essikado, Nana Kobina Nketsiah IV on 29 January 1952 with 38 students (30 boys and eight girls). School was conducted in the buildings of the old Sekondi hospital.

The school moved to its current site in 1955 where it assumed its name Fijai Secondary School and recently changed to Fijai Senior High School.

Emblem 
The school emblem is an "Aquilline" eagle flying towards the sky and stars, through great storms and lightning as the school motto indicates Ad Astra Per Aspera,  meaning "To the Stars Through Thick and Thin".

Anthem 
We started young in earnest

In search of knowledge pure and true

And at our motherland behest

To give of our country of our best

And so we daily struggling through

chorus

adastra 3x,

per adua

to the stars 3x

through thick and thin

Headmasters

Notable alumni 
 Sophia Ophilia Adjeibea Adinyira, justice of the Supreme Court of Ghana (20062019)
 Ayikoi Otoo, lawyer and politician
 General Emmanuel Alexander Erskine, soldier
 Joe Baidoo-Ansah, politician
 Paapa Owusu-Ankomah, politician
 Nana Yaa Brefo, journalist, Angel FM 102.9
 Esther Efua Dampson, KNUST, Materials Engineering department

References 

1952 establishments in Gold Coast (British colony)
Educational institutions established in 1952
High schools in Ghana
Sekondi-Takoradi
Education in the Western Region (Ghana)